Al-Mazar was a Palestinian Arab village located  northeast of al-Sarafand. In 1945, it had a population of 210.

History
The village name Mazar, which is Arabic for "shrine", "a place one visits", was probably meant to commemorate the many people who were killed and buried there in the wars against the Crusaders.

A population list from about 1887 showed that el Mizar  had about 85  inhabitants; all Muslims.

British Mandate period
In the British Mandate of Palestine period, in the 1922 census of Palestine ‘’Al Mazar’’ had a population of 134; all Muslims.  
In the 1931 census,  Al-Mazar was counted together with Khirbat Al-Manara, Ijzim and Qumbaza. The total population was 2,160; 88 Christians, 2,082  Muslims, in a total of 442 houses.

In the 1945 statistics  the population was 210, all Muslims with a total of 7,976 dunams of land. Of this, 5 dunams were for citrus and  bananas, 473  were plantations or irrigable land, 3,750 were for  cereals,  while 39 dunams were classified built-up, (urban),  land.

1948 and aftermath
The village was first raided by the Israel Forces (IDF) on May 17 during the 1948 Arab-Israeli war, with the aim of "rendering [the village] unworthy of use."  The IDF encountered only 10-20 Arabs, who ran away, and the troops proceeded to "burn what could be burned." Within days of the IDF's withdrawal, some of the villagers had returned, Arab militants and civilians. The village was permanently depopulated as a result of another IDF military assault in mid-July 1948. Following the war the area was incorporated into the State of Israel and the kibbutz of Ein Carmel was established partially on al-Mazar's land in 1950.

Shaykh Yahia/Ahya shrine
The Maqam (shrine) was located on the lower slopes of a hill.  In 1881, E. H. Palmer described the name as possibly  coming from St. John of Tyre, who was noted in this direction in 1187. Ahya is also a name for John the Baptist.

The shrine was surveyed by Ronen and  Olami in 1964–65. They found a  two roomed structure, facing east–west. The  eastern  room seemed the oldest; it was a domed rectangular room made of kurkar stone, where the surface were coated with plaster containing Byzantine pottery fragments. The western room was built of limestone.

The shrine has now been destroyed, and the area has been converted into orchards.

References

Bibliography

 
 
 

   
 
Ronen, Avraham. Olami, Ya'aqov.(1978): (in Hebrew): Atlit map, Archaeological Survey of Israel.  (p. 63-65)

External links
Welcome To al-Mazar
al-Mazar (Haifa), Zochrot
Survey of Western Palestine, Map 5:  IAA, Wikimedia commons 
al-Mazar, from the Khalil Sakakini Cultural Center

Arab villages depopulated during the 1948 Arab–Israeli War
District of Haifa